Nikola Todorov Kotkov (9 December 1938 – 30 June 1971), nicknamed Koteto (Котето, "The Kitten") was a Bulgarian footballer who played as a striker.

Born in the capital Sofia, Kotkov started his football career as a Lokomotiv Sofia trainee and went on to spend much of it (1956–1969) with the club, winning the Bulgarian Championship in 1964. He then played for Levski Sofia, until his death in 1971. Kotkov died together with his friend and teammate Georgi Asparuhov in a traffic accident in the Vitinya Pass of the Balkan Mountains, en route to Vratsa. With Levski, Kotkov became once again champion in 1970, winning the Bulgarian Cup the same year.

Kotkov played a total of 322 matches and scored 163 goals in the Bulgarian Championship and was given the Bulgarian Footballer of the Year award in 1964. For the Bulgaria national team, he had 26 caps and scored 12 goals, taking part in the 1966 FIFA World Cup in England.

Kotkov was known for his technique, pinpoint passing and skillful free kick taking.

Statistics 
 National teams — 59 matches, 33 goals
 Bulgarian championship — 322 matches, 163 goals — 286/145 for Lokomotiv,  45/25 for Levski
 European club tournaments — 11 matches, 10 goals — CEC-6, CWC-5
 First match — with Lokomotiv Sofia 1956
 Last match — with Levski against CSKA — 28 June 1971
 All - 392 matches, 206 goals

Honours 
 Champion of Bulgaria — 2 times, 1964 with Lokomotiv and 1970 with Levski
 Holder of the National Cup — 2 times 1970, 1971 (posthumously) with Levski
 Bulgarian Footballer of the Year — 1964
 UEFA Euro Under-19 Champion with Bulgaria — 1959
 Holder of an Order of Labour — 1970
 Deserved Master of Sports
 25th place in the Golden Ball quiz — 1967

References

External links 
 Article about Kotkov from a PFC Lokomotiv Sofia fansite 
 Profile at LevskiSofia.info

1938 births
1971 deaths
Bulgarian footballers
Bulgaria international footballers
FC Lokomotiv 1929 Sofia players
PFC Levski Sofia players
First Professional Football League (Bulgaria) players
1966 FIFA World Cup players
Footballers from Sofia
Road incident deaths in Bulgaria
20th-century Bulgarian people
Association football forwards